Cease to Suffer is the debut full-length album released by the heavy metal band A Perfect Murder.

Track listing
 "I've Lost"  – 2:20
 "Pushed Too Far"  – 1:36
 "Cease to Suffer"  – 2:47
 "The Burning Cross"  – 1:23
 "Last Kiss"  – 2:08
 "Laughed at My Pain"  – 2:29
 "Choke"  – 1:54
 "Disappear"  – 2:13
 "Lose It All"  – 2:31
 "Dead and Gone"  – 3:08
 "Interlude"  – 1:34
 "Prophet on a Lie"  – 2:36

A Perfect Murder (band) albums
2003 debut albums
Cyclop Media albums